is a 2012 Japanese high school drama film directed by Daihachi Yoshida and based on a novel by Ryo Asai. It was released on August 11, 2012. The film won several awards, including the Japan Academy Prize for Picture of the Year, and also received several nominations.

Plot 

Kirishima is a popular second-year high school student. He is captain of the volleyball team, does well academically, and is dating one of the most popular girls in the school. One day he suddenly stops showing up to school, and rumors begin circulating that he's quitting the volleyball club.

The same day, the school's film club is mocked during morning assembly for the title of a romantic film they were forced to make by their teacher. Against their teacher's wishes, they decide to begin filming a zombie movie. While filming, they run into Sawajima, the captain of the brass band club. Sawajima has a crush on Hiroki, Kirishima's best friend and popular girl Sana's boyfriend. Sawajima is trying to impress Hiroki by nonchalantly playing saxophone within view of him, but she is unsuccessful at impressing the boys and instead ends up disrupting the film club's filming.

In Kirishima's absence the smaller Koizumi is made the volleyball team's libero. During the weekend, Kirishima continues to remain unreachable. The volleyball team loses a match against another school, which upsets the larger and quick-tempered Kubo, who blames Koizumi and the absent Kirishima.

Outside of school, film club head Maeda runs into badminton club member Kasumi, who unlike the other girls treats him with respect and shows interest in the zombie film. Maeda develops feelings for Kasumi, though he later discovers that she is secretly dating Kirishima's friend Ryuta. Other badminton club member Mika shows sympathy for Koizumi over Kubo's harsh treatment.

A rift develops in Kirishima's girlfriend Risa's social circle. As Sana finds amusement in the volleyball club's conflicts, angering Mika. While in turn Mika takes glee in Risa's inability to contact Kirishima, angering Risa and Sana.

Sawajima overhears Sana and Hiroki planning to meet after school, and goes to their meetup spot before them in order to play saxophone, again unintentionally disrupting the film club. The film club agree to leave to instead go film on the school's roof. As Sana arrives and sees Sawajima waiting, she kisses Hiroki out of jealousy, causing Sawajima to run off.

In the school gym, Kubo's anger with Koizumi boils over, but just before he begins beating Koizumi up, Tomohiro runs in and says Kirishima is on the roof of the school. Kirishima's friends, the volleyball club boys, badminton club girls, and Risa and Sana all run to the school's roof, but they find only the film club with no sign of Kirishima. Kubo takes his anger out on the film club, leading to a brawl in which everybody's emotions and frustrations come out.

Cast
 No club (boys)
 Masahiro Higashide as Hiroki Kikuchi
 Motoki Ochiai as Ryuta
 Kodai Asaka as Tomohiro
 No club (girls)
 Mayu Matsuoka as Sana
 Mizuki Yamamoto as Risa
 Film club
 Ryunosuke Kamiki as Ryoya Maeda
 Tomoya Maeno as Takefumi
 Volleyball club
 Taiga Nakano as Fusuke Koizumi
 Nobuyuki Suzuki as Kubo
 Badminton club
 Ai Hashimoto as Kasumi
 Kurumi Shimizu as Mika Miyabe
 Brass band club
 Suzuka Ogo as Aya Sawajima
 Takemi Fujii as Shiori
 Supporting cast
 Shuhei Takahashi
 Hideto Iwai as Katayama
 Tomofumi Okumura
 Enomoto Isao as Hino

Production
Principal photography took place in Kōchi.

Reception

Critical response
On Film Business Asia, Derek Elley gave the film a grade of 8 out of 10, calling it "an offbeat gem".

Accolades

References

External links

2012 films
2010s teen drama films
Films based on Japanese novels
Films directed by Daihachi Yoshida
Nippon TV films
Films shot in Kōchi Prefecture
Japanese high school films
Picture of the Year Japan Academy Prize winners
Japanese teen drama films
2010s high school films
2012 drama films
2010s Japanese films